Michael Clayton is a 2007 film starring George Clooney.

Michael Clayton may also refer to:
Mike Clayton (golfer) (born 1957), Australian professional golfer
Michael Clayton (American football) (born 1982), former American football wide receiver
Michael Clayton (soundtrack), the soundtrack for the film

Clayton, Michael